Thomas Shackle (28 July 1834 – 12 March 1887) was an English cricketer who enjoyed a brief season of first-class cricket for Middlesex in 1868, and otherwise played regularly for non-first-class teams including Buckinghamshire, Southgate and Wimbledon cricket clubs. His Middlesex season featured three matches, where he scored 67 runs at a batting average of 16.75 and a best of 41 not out.

Notes

External links
 

1834 births
1887 deaths
Middlesex cricketers
English cricketers